Caleb Wild Hammill (1863-1921) was one of the founders of the stockbrokerage and banking investment firm of Shearson, Hammill & Co., founded in 1902 by Mr. Hammill & Edward Shearson. It was in existence from 1902 to 1974 under that original name. 

Hammill was born in Chicago, Illinois, and raised in Albion, Michigan, the ancestral town of his grandmother and great-grandparents. His parents were Caleb Wild & Elizabeth (Pine) Hammill.  Hammill married Maude Echols of Fort Smith, Arkansas in 1903. 

Hammill died in Paris, France on July 19, 1921. He is interred in Woodland Cemetery in the Bronx, NY.

References 

"Caleb W. Hammill Dead." New York Times, July 20, 1921, pg. 15.
"Caleb W. Hammill's Will Filed." New York Times, August 18, 1921.
"Caleb Wild Hammill." Find a Grave.
"Wild Stockbroker had Albion Ties." Morning Star (Albion, Michigan), February 22, 2009.

1863 births
1921 deaths
Businesspeople from Illinois